Andrew Michael Tobin (born June 27, 1958) is the Director of the Arizona Department of Administration. He formerly was a member of the Arizona Corporation Commission and also served in the Arizona House of Representatives from the state's 1st district, and as former Speaker, beginning in 2011. He currently serves as the Director of the Arizona Department of Administration.

In 2014 Tobin ran for Arizona's 1st congressional district against incumbent Ann Kirkpatrick (D), who won with 52.6% of the vote. He previously served as the appointed director of the State Department of Insurance and Interim Superintendent of the state Department of Financial Institutions. He additionally served nine months as director of the Arizona Weights and Measures Department.

Tobin ran in 2016 for reelection to the Corporation Commission, he won in the Republican primary on August 30, 2016 and in the general election.

Biography
Tobin was born in 1958 as the second of six children in New York City to an Irish-American family. He is the son of a (now) retired New York City Police lieutenant. His grandparents immigrated from Ireland.

Tobin moved to Arizona in 1979, where he worked in banking and real estate lending for 13 years in the Phoenix metropolitan area.  He moved to Dewey 16 years ago. He started his own employee benefit company, known as TLC Employee Benefits and Consulting. He specializes in insurance, marketing and public relations.

Tobin owned and operated a local Farmers Insurance agency for six years.  He was also CEO of a local aerospace company employing 200 people for three years until 2003.

Tobin was elected the national president of the United States Junior Chamber of Commerce from 1988 to 1989. In that capacity Tobin served as ex-officio board member of the Muscular Dystrophy Association, St. Jude Children's Research Hospital and the Hugh O'Brian Youth Leadership Foundation. As president of the United States Junior Chamber, Tobin lobbied the Reagan Administration and later the Bush Administration for passage of the Line-Item Veto and a Balanced Budget Amendment.

Politics

Arizona Legislature

Tobin was first elected to the Arizona House of Representatives in 2006. He was reelected for three more terms, in 2008, 2010 and 2012.

In 2009 Tobin was one of 14 Arizona lawmakers investigated for accepting gifts from lobbyists for the Fiesta Bowl, which is prohibited by state statutes. He was not charged with any crime.

Tobin has served as state House Majority Whip and House Majority Leader. In 2011, he was elected Speaker.

2014 congressional campaign

Tobin ran for Congress in Arizona's 1st congressional district, challenging incumbent Representative Ann Kirkpatrick (D). He was endorsed by Mitt Romney.

On August 26, 2014, in the Republican primary, Tobin faced off against State Rep. Adam Kwasman and rancher Gary Kiehne . According to Politico, Tobin was seen as the moderate candidate. The race was initially too close to call. Election results were finalized and Tobin was officially declared the primary's winner on September 2, when Kiehne conceded the race.

Tobin lost to Kirkpatrick 52.5%-47.5%.

Personal life
Tobin and his wife Jennifer have five children. They have lived in their home in Paulden since 2004.

References

External links

  Andy Tobin, official site of the Arizona House of Representatives

1958 births
Living people
Republican Party members of the Arizona House of Representatives
Speakers of the Arizona House of Representatives